The Boston Women's Memorial is a trio of sculptures on the Commonwealth Avenue Mall in Boston, Massachusetts, commemorating Phillis Wheatley, Abigail Adams, and Lucy Stone.

Overview
The idea of a memorial to women was first discussed in 1992 in recognition of the under-representation of women among Boston's statues. A collaboration between the Boston Women's Commission, the Commonwealth Avenue Mall Committee and the Massachusetts Historical Society, supported by Angela Menino, the mayor's wife, developed it over the next twelve years.

The design competition was won by New York sculptor Meredith Bergmann. The memorial was unveiled on October 25, 2003, by the mayor of Boston, Thomas Menino. The monument was criticized at the time as a quick-fix attempt to address the lack of female representation in Boston's public art, grouping together three historical figures who merit recognition as individuals. "The memorials to men around town don't herd heroes together; neither should a memorial to women," Christine Temin wrote in the Boston Globe.

The statues present the women at street level, rather than on a plinth, although plinths are used as part of the artwork. Stone, for example, is positioned using her plinth as an editorial desk, working on the Woman's Journal, which she founded. Quotations from the women are inscribed on their plinths.

Local people regularly leave items at or on the statues — scarves around the figure's necks in winter, a Boston Red Sox cap on one's head when the team won the World Series in 2004.

The memorial is featured on the Ladies Walk of the Boston Women's Heritage Trail.

References

External links

 

2003 establishments in Massachusetts
2003 sculptures
Landmarks in Back Bay, Boston
Monuments and memorials to women
Monuments and memorials in Boston
Outdoor sculptures in Boston
Sculptures of women in Massachusetts
Statues in Boston